Littleton is an unincorporated community in Buchanan County, Iowa, United States, northwest of Independence. Littleton lies in section 9 of Perry Township. The town had 250 persons in 1960, the latest year for which a census is available.

History

Littleton was platted in 1855 by Moses Little, while Chatham was platted by Dr. Robert W. Wright.  Chatham is in Section 10 of the Perry Township, with Littleton just on the other side in Section 9.  The post office was established in 1851, before being switched to Littleton in the 1880s. Littleton's population was 88 in 1902.

Though Littleton had a booming beginning, the community never incorporated, remaining forever a small town on a side road between Independence and Jesup. While many residents were not even aware they lived in Chatham, more people are becoming aware of its existence through the efforts of the Littleton and Chatham Historical Society. The LCHS was established in 2007 and acquired the former Pleasant Grove Presbyterian Church in 2014 Littleton and Chatham Historical Society.

See also

Wapsipinicon River

References

External links

 Littleton and Chatham, Iowa

Unincorporated communities in Iowa
Unincorporated communities in Buchanan County, Iowa
1855 establishments in Iowa
Populated places established in 1855